David M. Berube is a professor of communication at North Carolina State University in Raleigh, North Carolina. His doctorate is from New York University and he has studied and taught communication and cognitive psychology and created the term SEIN (Social and Ethical Implications of Nanotechnology) in his book NanoHype.

Education
New York University PhD. in Media and Culture 1990. He received an MA from Montclair State University in 1978 and a BA/BS from Seton Hall University in 1975.

Career
Since 2008, he directs a program titled the Public Communication of Science and Technology (PCOST). PCOST has focused on consumer and public understanding of highly complicated science and engineering communication activities.  He teaches limited graduate coursework (due to his grant responsibilities).

Prior to NCSU, he was a professor at the University of South Carolina, Columbia, South Carolina and was a lecturer at Weber State University (UT), Trinity University (TX), and the University of Vermont. During the last 30 years through 2007, he served as a national and international intercollegiate debating coach with many national records  coaching over 40 formal national and international debating topics. He edited one of the most successful collegiate debate workbook companies in America and he is a coordinating editor with the Journal of Nanoparticle Research  where he supervises social science methodologies. He  served on the US FDA Risk Communication Advisory Committee and on the Board of Scientific Counselors for the National Toxicology Program.  These experiences and many others have provided him with a broad exposure and understanding of many subjects and has made him the “outside-in” person who is recruited to deal with a host of interdisciplinary research activities.

After coaching two national championships at the National Parliamentary Tournament of Excellence in 2004 & 2005 and promoted to full professor, he returned to studying science and technology communication and cognitive psychology. This let him to participate as a principal investigator or co-principal investigator on an extensive series of National Science Foundation grants examining how the public unpacks and makes sense of complicated technical information in emerging science, especially the field of nanotechnology. He has authored and co-authored many articles on risk perceptions associated with nanoparticles both quantitative and critical in nature.

In 1997, he wrote the famous "Berube 97" article on dehumanization that has been used by high school and collegiate debaters in almost every single debate thereafter. In 2006, he wrote Nanohype: The Truth Behind the Nanotechnology Buzz. Amherst, NY: Prometheus Press, 2005, 500 pp. and received over 30 published reviews,. In 2015 he broadened his interests to include public understanding of synthetic biology and became a research fellow with the Genetic Engineering and Society Center on the campus of North Carolina State. In 2021 he edited Pandemic Communication and Resiliency  for Springer/NATURE and in 2023 he wrote a sole author work: Pandemic Risk Management: Lessons from the Zika Virus.

Berube has worked on a series of projects for the corporate world including Director of Communications for the International Council on Nanotechnology with partners including Intel, Swiss RE, Mitsubishi, L'Oreal, Procter & Gamble, etc. He has directed social media projects that produced White Paper level publications for the National Science Foundation and the International Food Information Council. He has directly consulted with Kraft Foods International on media protocols and has spoken as an invited lecturer to the Pentagon, Pharma, the Institute for Defense Analysis, etc. He has worked as a PI, CoPI, or investigator on approximately $20 million in grants and worked on a major NSA funded grant in the Laboratory for Analytical Science at NCSU where he served on the Mission Enabling Workgroup and the Supply Line Workgroup. He is a CoPI with the Research Triangle Nanotechnology Network (RTNN) as the social and ethical director and assessment officer coordinating in a major infrastructure grant under the National Nanotechnology Initiative's (NNI) National Nanotechnology Coordinated Infrastructure in a team headed found in North Carolina's Research Triangle.

The RTNN involves labs on three campuses: North Carolina State, UNC at Chapel Hill, and Duke.  by the Analytical Instrumentation Facility at North Carolina State University including labs at UNC and Duke, specifically Chapel Hill Analytical and Fabrication Facility and (CHANL) at the University of North Carolina at Chapel Hill and the Shared Materials Instrumentation Facility (SMIF) at Duke University.

Berube has consulted as a jobber with the Gerson Lehrman Group and others. He manages the Center for Emerging Technologies, LLC, a consultancy registered in North Carolina.

References

New York University alumni
North Carolina State University faculty
University of South Carolina faculty
Weber State University faculty
University of Vermont faculty
Living people
Year of birth missing (living people)